The Many Worlds of Andre Norton is a collection of fantasy and science fantasy short stories by American writer Andre Norton, edited by Roger Elwood. It was first published in August 1974 in simultaneous hardcover editions by Chilton (US) and Thomas Nelson (Canada). A paperback edition, retitled The Book of Andre Norton and omitting the name of the editor, was issued by DAW Books in October 1975, and was reprinted in November 1977, July 1981 and September 1987.

The book collects seven novellas and short stories along with one essay by Norton, with an introduction by Donald A. Wollheim, an essay on Norton by Rick Brooks, and a bibliography of Norton's works as of 1975 by Helen-Jo Jakusz Hewitt. The stories include the Witch World tale "The Toads of Grimmerdale".

Contents
"Introduction" (Donald A. Wollheim)
"The Toads of Grimmerdale" (from Flashing Swords! #2, edited by Lin Carter, 1974)
"London Bridge" (from The Magazine of Fantasy and Science Fiction, v. 45, no. 4, October 1973)
"On Writing Fantasy" (from Dipple Chronicle, November/December 1971)
"Mousetrap" (from The Magazine of Fantasy and Science Fiction, v. 6, no. 6, June 1954)
"All Cats Are Gray" (from Fantastic Universe, v. 1, no. 2, August–September 1953)
"The Long Night of Waiting" (from The Long Night of Waiting and Other Stories, edited by Roger Elwood, 1974)
"The Gifts of Asti" (from Fantasy Book, v. 1, no. 3, July 1948)
"Long Live Lord Kor!" (from Worlds of Fantasy, no. 2, September 1970)
"Andre Norton: Loss of Faith" (Rick Brooks) (from Dipple Chronicle, November/December 1971)
"Andre Norton Bibliography" (Helen-Jo Jakusz Hewitt)

Notes

1974 short story collections
Fantasy short story collections
Short story collections by Andre Norton
Chilton Company books